Tarzan in Manhattan is a 1989 action adventure CBS television film.  Joe Lara portrays Tarzan, and Kim Crosby appears as Jane Porter.  Tony Curtis and Jan-Michael Vincent co-star.  The telefilm was produced by Max A. Keller, Micheline H. Keller and Gina Scheerer, written by Anna Sandor and William Gough (based on characters created by Edgar Rice Burroughs), and directed by Michael Schultz.  It aired on April 15, 1989.

Plot
Tarzan leaves Africa and goes to present-day New York City to seek vengeance for the murder of his Ape mother Kala, and to rescue Cheeta who was taken by hunters working for B. B. Brightmore (Jan-Michael Vincent) and his Brightmore Foundation.  Soon Tarzan discovers this supposed philanthropic organization is conducting illegal tests on animal brains in an effort to transfer the thoughts and knowledge of one creature to another, and he sets out to rescue the animals and expose Brightmore.  He is aided by Jane Porter (a cab driver, played by Kim Crosby) and her father, Archimedes "Archie" Porter (Tony Curtis), a retired police officer, now the head of his own security agency.

With Brightmore's operations shut down, Jane joins her father's security agency, and both talk Tarzan into coming on board at minimum wage, but with all the bananas Cheeta can eat.

Cast
Joe Lara as Tarzan
Kim Crosby as Jane Porter, reluctant ally of Tarzan
Tony Curtis as Archimedes "Archie" Porter, Jane's father
Jan-Michael Vincent as B. B. Brightmore, villain who kidnaps animals for illicit research
Joe Seneca as Joseph, African storekeeper, mentor and friend to Tarzan
Sloan Fischer as Some Man

Production
Joe Lara also later starred in Tarzan: The Epic Adventures, an otherwise unrelated interpretation of the character.

Soundtrack
Warren Zevon's Leave My Monkey Alone plays on the soundtrack as Tarzan's plane flies over prominent New York landmarks. Also, Grace Jones's Pull Up to the Bumper plays on the soundtrack in Jane's taxicab.

References

External links
 

1989 films
1989 television films
1989 action films
1980s adventure films
1989 fantasy films
CBS network films
Films set in New York City
Tarzan films
Television shows based on American novels
Films directed by Michael Schultz
Films scored by Charles Fox